Abie's Irish Rose is a 1946 American comedy film directed by A. Edward Sutherland based on a play by Anne Nichols. The film stars Michael Chekhov, Joanne Dru, Richard Norris, J. M. Kerrigan, George E. Stone, Vera Gordon, and Emory Parnell. The film was released on December 27, 1946, by United Artists. It was a remake of the 1928 film that was based on the 1922 play Abie's Irish Rose by Anne Nichols. The film drew criticism for stereotyping and additional cuts were made after complaints.

Plot

Stationed in London, the Jewish American soldier Abie Levy falls in love with a young Irish Catholic lady, Rosemary Murphy, and they get married. Their families are not informed, and when the time comes for Rosemary to return to the United States, the only thing Abie tells his father Solomon is that he has met a girl and is in love.

Solomon takes a liking to Rosemary, but assumes she shares the same faith. A wedding is planned, no one else yet told that the couple are already husband and wife. The bride-to-be's father, Patrick Murphy, arrives, under the false impression that his daughter intends to wed an Irish Catholic man named McGee.

Once the truth is revealed, neither father is on speaking terms with the children or each other. A year goes by and Rosemary gives birth. Family friends, the Cohens and an Irish priest, coax the grandfathers into finally making a visit. A baby boy, given the name Patrick Levy, promptly delights Patrick Murphy but disappoints Solomon, at least until the baby's twin sister, Rebecca, is also brought into the room. Rebecca being his late wife's name, Solomon is pleased, and the families finally come together.

Cast 

Michael Chekhov as Solomon Levy
Joanne Dru as Rosemary Murphy Levy
Richard Norris (1922–2005) as Abie Levy
J. M. Kerrigan as Patrick Murphy
George E. Stone as Isaac Cohen
Vera Gordon as Mrs. Cohen
Emory Parnell as Father John Whalen
Art Baker as Rabbi Jacob Samuels
Eric Blore as Stubbins
Bruce Merritt as Rev. Tom Stevens
Roy Atwell as Dick Saunders
Eddie Parks as Gilchrist
Vera Marshe as Mrs. Edna Gilchrist
James Nolan as Policeman
Charlie Hall as Hotel Porter
Harry Hays Morgan as Hotel Clerk

See also 
 The Cohens and Kellys: A film with a similar plot
 Nichols v. Universal Pictures Corp.

References

External links 
 

1946 films
American black-and-white films
1940s English-language films
Films directed by A. Edward Sutherland
United Artists films
1946 comedy films
American comedy films
Religious comedy films
Films set in London
1940s American films